The 2000–01 season saw Rotherham United compete in the Football League Second Division where they finished in 2nd position with 91 points and gained promotion to the Football League First Division.

Final league table

Results
Rotherham United's score comes first

Legend

Football League First Division

FA Cup

Football League Cup

Football League Trophy

Squad statistics

References

External links
 Rotherham United 2000–01 at Soccerbase.com (select relevant season from dropdown list)

Rotherham United F.C. seasons
Rotherham United